Galileo Magazine of Science & Fiction was an American science and science fiction magazine published out of Boston, Massachusetts.

Publication history 
The first issue was released in September 1976. Issue #5 was published in October 1977. It then changed to a bimonthly publishing schedule beginning with issue #6 published in January 1978. The last issue published was issue #16 in January 1980. Issue #17 was planned, but the magazine folded and only the covers for #17 were printed.

Contributors
Larry Niven's The Ringworld Engineers was serialized in #13–#16. Other contributors include: 
Brian Aldiss
Ray Bradbury
Damien Broderick 
Arthur C. Clarke
Harlan Ellison
Joe Haldeman
Frank Herbert
Robert Silverberg
Joan D. Vinge
Jack Williamson
Larry Blamire - Illustrator

Issues
Issue #1 1976 (quarterly)
Issue #2 1976 (quarterly)
Issue #3 1977 (quarterly)
Issue #4 July 1977 (quarterly)
Issue #5 October 1977 (quarterly)
Issue #6 January 1978 (bimonthly)
Issue #7 March 1978 (bimonthly)
Issue #8 May 1978 (bimonthly)
Issue #9 July 1978 (bimonthly)
Issue #10 September 1978 (bimonthly)
Issue #11 & 12 double issue June 1979 (bimonthly)
Issue #13 July 1979 (bimonthly)
Issue #14 September 1979 (bimonthly)
Issue #15 November 1979 (bimonthly)
Issue #16 January 1980 (bimonthly)

See also
 List of defunct American periodicals
 Locus magazine
 Galactic Central

References

External links 
 Galileo at the Science Fiction Encyclopedia

Bimonthly magazines published in the United States
Quarterly magazines published in the United States
Defunct science fiction magazines published in the United States
Magazines disestablished in 1980
Magazines established in 1976
Magazines published in Boston
Science fiction magazines established in the 1970s